"Get It Done" is the 15th episode of the seventh and final season of the television show Buffy the Vampire Slayer.  It reveals the origin of the slayers.

Plot
The First Slayer tells Buffy in a dream that "It is not enough."

Anya and Spike are walking when a demon appears, sent by D'Hoffryn to kill Anya. Spike defeats the demon but allows it to live.

Principal Wood tells Buffy to go home and concentrate on her "real" job, killing monsters and getting ready to battle the First. Buffy takes him to the house and introduces him to the rest of the crew, including Spike. The tension between Spike and Wood is tangible. Wood gives Buffy a bag that he got from his mother and should have been passed on to Buffy anyway.

Chloe dies of suicide after the First talks to her all night. Buffy delivers a strong lecture, angering many of the others. She accuses Spike of holding back in fights and rebukes him that he used to be a better fighter before he got his soul back. She calls an emergency and opens the slayer's bag. Inside is a set of shadow figures that trigger a portal. Against the advice of her friends, Buffy jumps in, sending back an enormous demon that beats everybody up and flees. After Spike recovers, he gets his leather coat out of a trunk and tracks down the demon. Fighting with his old swagger, from before he regained his soul, Spike kills the demon after a long, brutal battle. He then drags it back to Buffy's house.

On the other side of the portal, Buffy is back in the desert where she once met the First Slayer. There, three African shamans speaking Swahili, tell her she is the last slayer to guard the Hellmouth and try to infuse her with additional essence of the demon that give all the slayers their strength. Buffy refuses the power, telling the men that they were wrong to have created the slayer line in the first place. As a parting gift, one of them touches Buffy's head and gives her a vision (though the viewer does not immediately see what it is).

After struggling with the incantation, Willow manages to reopen the portal by sucking energy from Anya and Kennedy. Spike throws the dead demon in, and Buffy returns. Later, she tells Willow about the vision and admits that the First Slayer was right that what they have is not enough. Willow asks Buffy what she saw, and the vision is shown to the viewer: Inside the Hellmouth, the First has an army made up of thousands of Turok-Han vampires.

Reception

External links

 

2003 American television episodes
Buffy the Vampire Slayer (season 7) episodes
Television episodes about shamanism